1930 saw the Argentine league restructured as a league of 36 teams, playing one another once. The eventual champions were Boca Juniors. Following the disruption of the 1929 season by mass abandonment of games, the second half of the 1930 season was marred in a similar way. This trend was halted by the inception of the professional era in 1931.

The Argentina national team reached the final of the first FIFA World Cup where they lost to Uruguay.

Primera División

Relegation
The teams occupying the bottom two positions of the league were relegated. Argentino del Sud set one of the worst points tallies in the history of South American football. The other team, Honor y Patria, was relegated in its first season at the top level.

Segunda División
Champion: Nueva Chicago

Argentina national team
FIFA World Cup
1930 FIFA World Cup: runners up

References

 
Seasons in Argentine football
1930 in South American football
1930 in Argentine sport